As a result of the Massachusetts general election, 2006, the Democrats picked up one open seat in the Massachusetts State Senate, the only change from the previous session. The current session began in January, 2007, and consists of 35 Democrats and 5 Republicans.

The 2006 Massachusetts House election was held on the same date as the Senate election, as well as Federal and Gubernatorial elections (see Massachusetts general election, 2006).

Twenty-seven of the forty seats were left uncontested by one of the major parties in the 2006 election.

Results

|-
!style="background-color:#E9E9E9" align=left width=350 10em" colspan="2" rowspan="2" | Party
!style="background-color:#E9E9E9" align=center colspan="3" | Seats
!style="background-color:#E9E9E9" align=center colspan="2" | Popular Vote
|-
!style="background-color:#E9E9E9" align=right| 2004
!style="background-color:#E9E9E9" align=right| 2006
!style="background-color:#E9E9E9" align=right| +/−
!style="background-color:#E9E9E9" align=right| Vote
!style="background-color:#E9E9E9" align=right| %
|- 
| 
| style="text-align: left" | Democratic Party
| 34
| 35
| +1
| 1,414,429
| 75.9%
|-
| 
| style="text-align: left" | Republican Party
| 6
| 5
| −1
| 421,781
| 22.6%
|-
| 
| style="text-align: left" | Independents
| 0
| 0
| 0
| 11,720
| 0.6%
|-
| style="background-color: ; width: 5px" |
| style="text-align: left" | Green Party
| 0
| 0
| 0
| 1,988
| 0.1%
|-
| style="background-color: #000000; width: 5px" |
| style="text-align: left" | Others
| 0
| 0
| 0
| 13,886
| 0.7%
|-
! colspan=2 align=left | Total
| 40
| 40
| 0
| 1,863,804
| 100%
|-
|}

Complete list of Senate contests in 2006
Official results from State Election Results 2006 (PDF, 340 kB) on the Massachusetts Elections Division website

Primary Results

Official results from State Primary Election Results 2006 (PDF, 196k) on the Massachusetts Elections Division website

Democratic Primary

Republican Primary

See also
 2007–2008 Massachusetts legislature
 List of Massachusetts General Courts

References 
 Election Results from the Boston Globe

External links
 
 Samiyah Diaz campaign page
 Helen Sharron campaign page
 Margie Ware campaign page
 

State Senate
Senate 2006
Mass
Massachusetts Senate